Leroboleng is a volcano located in the eastern part of the island of Flores, Indonesia.

See also 
 List of volcanoes in Indonesia

References 

Leroboleng
Leroboleng
Leroboleng
Complex volcanoes